Robbinsville High School is a public, co-educational secondary school located in Robbinsville, North Carolina. It is the only high school in the Graham County Schools system.

School information
For the 2011–2012 school year, Robbinsville High School had a total population of 372 students and 29.8 teachers on a (FTE) basis. The student population had a gender ratio of 192 male to 180 female. The demographic group makeup of the student population was: White, 310 American Indian, 52; Hispanic, 4; Black, 1; and Asian/Pacific Islander, 0 (two or more races, 5). For the same school year, 204 of the students received free or reduced-cost lunches.

History
The origins of Robbinsville High School begin in the early 1900s. In 1924, the school was relocated into what is known as The Old Rock Building. The school building housed all grades including high school grades until the 1966–67 school year when it was split into separate high, middle and elementary schools.

In 1987, Stecoah High School in the eastern part of Graham County, closed. The high school portion was then merged into Robbinsville High.

Athletics
According to the North Carolina High School Athletic Association, for the 2012–2013 school year, Robbinsville High is a 1A school in the Smoky Mountain Conference. The Robbinsville mascot is the Black Knights, wearing the school colors of black and white. Prior to becoming the Black Knights the Robbinsville High School mascot was the Blue Devil.

The school offers teams in a variety of sports: baseball, boys' and girls' basketball (varsity and JV), cross country, football, softball, track and field, volleyball, and wrestling. The Black Knights' football team has won 14 state championships in the A/1A classes, the last being in 2019. The Black Knights defeated Plymouth 21–18 to win the 2014 1A state championship. This was the first championship for head coach Dee Walsh.

References

External links
 

Buildings and structures in Graham County, North Carolina
Education in Graham County, North Carolina
Public high schools in North Carolina